Bruna Honorio da Silva (born ) is a Brazilian female volleyball player.

With her club Unilever Vôlei she competed at the 2013 FIVB Volleyball Women's Club World Championship. With her club Rexona Ades she competed at the 2015 FIVB Volleyball Women's Club World Championship.

Clubs
  São Bernardo Vôlei (2010–2011)
  E.C. Pinheiros (2011–2012)
  Unilever Vôlei (2012–2015)
  Vôlei Bauru (2015–2017)
  E.C. Pinheiros (2017–2018)
  Minas Tênis Clube (2018–2020)
  Minas Tênis Clube (2018–2020)
  Radomka Radom (2020–)

Awards

Individuals
 2013 South American Club Championship – "Best Blocker"
 2017–18 Brazilian Superliga – "Best Server" 
 2019 South American Club Championship – "Best Opposite Spiker"

Clubs
 2012–13 Brazilian Superliga –  Champion, with Unilever Vôlei
 2013–14 Brazilian Superliga –  Champion, with Rexona/Ades
 2014–15 Brazilian Superliga –  Champion, with Rexona/Ades
 2018–19 Brazilian Superliga –  Champion, with Itambé/Minas
 2013 South American Club Championship –  Champion, with Unilever Vôlei
 2015 South American Club Championship –  Champion, with Rexona/Ades
 2019 South American Club Championship –  Champion, with Itambé/Minas
 2020 South American Club Championship –  Champion, with Itambé/Minas
 2018 Club World Championship –  Runner-up, with Itambé/Minas

References

External links
 profile at FIVB.org
http://www.scoresway.com/?sport=volleyball&page=player&id=9662

1989 births
Living people
Brazilian women's volleyball players
Place of birth missing (living people)
Oral Roberts Golden Eagles athletes
Opposite hitters
Expatriate volleyball players in the United States
Brazilian expatriate sportspeople in the United States
Universiade silver medalists for Brazil
Universiade medalists in volleyball